Ruth G. Waddy (January 7, 1909 – May 24, 2003) was an American artist, printmaker, activist, and editor, based in Los Angeles.

Early life and education
Willanna Ruth Gilliam was born in Lincoln, Nebraska in 1909, and raised in Minneapolis, Minnesota, daughter of John Moses Gilliam and Willie Anna Choran Gilliam.  She lived near the Minneapolis Musem of Art, which was her first introduction to the art world. Her father worked as a waiter on the railroads; he died when Ruth was thirteen years old.  She attended the University of Minnesota to train for teaching, but left school to work as a domestic servant in Chicago, to help support her family during the Depression.  During World War II she moved with her young daughter to Los Angeles, California to work as a riveter at Douglas Aircraft Corporation. After the war she worked at a county hospital, where one of her co-workers was designer Noah Purifoy. While working as a clerk for Los Angeles County, Waddy was diagnosed with epilepsy. This prompted her to retire early. However, she realized she would now have time to accomplish many of the things she had hoped to someday do. One of those things was the intent to learn art.

Career
Waddy was in her fifties when she turned to a career in art, especially as a linocut printmaker. In 1962, Waddy founded Art West Associated, to gather and support the community of African-American artists in Los Angeles.  The association sponsored community and youth activities that raised awareness for black art in the area and advocated for black artists who could not get their recognized by mainstream museums. Some notable participants included Raymond Lark, Samella Lewis, John Riddle, and Alonzo Davis. Waddy studied briefly at Otis Art Institute, now called Otis College of Art and Design in 1965, and the following year traveled to the Soviet Union for an exhibit of African-American art, organized by a Chicago friend, Margaret Burroughs.  Also in 1966, her work was part of "The Negro in American Art," a traveling exhibition funded by the California Arts Commission.

Ruth G Waddy was known for her primary in linocut printmaking. For the most part, Waddy is known for creating very highly contrasting flooring prints that tended to contain stories about Black presence. In one of her most well-known works The Key, Waddy outlined her artwork with dark geometrical structures and used supplies like newspapers and magazines to scrap. She would pick subjects from regular daily life as well as influencing pictures of social difficulties. Her work, later on, became one of the most influential artworks in that era, especially in the Prints by American Negro Artist (1967). Waddy founded an organization of artists called Art West Associated which expanded on the groundbreaking work of co-op galleries including Eleven Associated, which laid the work of Black artists in the 1960s and 1970s in Los Angeles.

Waddy embarked on a cross-country bus trip to gather works for Prints by American Negro Artists (1967), a project funded by the National Endowment for the Arts. With Samella Lewis she edited Black Artists on Art (1969 and 1971).  Waddy and Lewis are considered to be two of the "founding mothers" of the Black Arts Movement in California. Her 1969 linocut print, The Key, is considered to be one of the most prominent pieces in the movement. She received awards from the Compton College in 1972, from the League of Allied Artists in 1981, from the California African American Museum in 1983, and the Vesta Award from the Woman's Building in 1986.  She was one of twelve African-American artists honored by the Los Angeles Bicentennial in 1981. She also received a lifetime achievement award from the Women's Caucus for Art in 2001, and an honorary doctorate from Otis Art Institute (now called Otis College of Art and Design) in 1987; the citation read, in part, "Your strong graphic images strike us with aesthetic, emotional, and social power, and your dedication to seeking out the distinctive experience of black artists in America has widened that power."

Exhibitions 
A selected list of exhibitions including works by Ruth G. Waddy:

 "Negro History Calendar Art Competition" - Safety Savings and Loan, Los Angeles, 1964
 "The Negro in American Art" - Dickson Art Galleries, UCLA, Los Angeles, 1966
 University of California, Davis, 1966
 Fine Art Gallery, San Diego, 1967
 "New Perspectives in Black Art" - Oakland Museum, Oakland, California, 1967
 "Negro History Week Art Exhibit" - Independence Square, Los Angeles, 1968
 "Prints by Ruth Waddy" - Scott United Methodist Church, Pasadena, California, 1976
 "A Vibrant Force" - Our Children Museum of African American Art, Los Angeles, 1979
 Impressions/Expressions Studio Museum, Harlem, New York, 1983
 "Ruth Waddy, A Retrospective" - Gallery Plus, Los Angeles, 1986

Awards 

 National Association of College Women, Los Angeles, 1963
 Angeles Mesa Young Womens Christian Association, Los Angeles, 1964
 United Nations cultural exchange to the Soviet Union, 1966
 National Conference of Artists, Virginia State University, Petersburg, Virginia, 1968
 Our Authors Study Club, Los Angeles, 1972
 National Conference of Artists, Pacific Region, Berkeley, California, 1976
 League of Allied Artists, Los Angeles, 1981
 California Afro-American Museum, 1983
 Vesta Award - Women's Building, Los Angeles, 1986
 Life Works Plaque Award - National Artists Conference, Los Angeles, 1987
 Honorary Doctor of Arts - Otis Art Institute, Parsons School of Design, New School of Social Research, New York, New York, 1987

Publications 

 Prints by American Negro Artists, 1965 (contributor) 
 Black Artists on Art, 1969 (author)

Personal life and legacy
Ruth Gilliam married and divorced William H. Waddy in the 1930s; they had one daughter, Marianna (later Maryom Ana Al-Wadi).  Ruth G. Waddy died in 2003, age 94, in San Francisco, California. Her papers are at the Amistad Research Center, Tulane University. A sketchbook that once belonged to Waddy was featured in a 2013 family art workshop sponsored by the Los Angeles County Museum of Art and the Los Angeles Public Library.

Waddy once stated "Maybe if I had started as young as my peers did, I would be more interested in recognition.. Yet, I do have a need to say what I feel out loud, regardless of whether anyone else hears me." That is exactly what she did. Her voice was heard, inspring others to make a difference no matter their age. Waddy's contributions to African-American art and advocacy for African-American artists has left a mark not only on America, but on the world as a whole.

References

1909 births
2003 deaths
African-American women artists
American women printmakers
African-American history in Los Angeles
Artists from Los Angeles
Artists from Lincoln, Nebraska
Otis College of Art and Design alumni
20th-century American printmakers
20th-century American women artists
African-American printmakers
20th-century African-American women
20th-century African-American artists
21st-century African-American people
21st-century African-American women